P Train may refer to:
 PATH (rail system)
 Phoenix Light Rail
 Pittsburgh Light Rail
 P (Los Angeles Railway)